Orgyia is a genus of tussock moths of the family Erebidae. The genus was described by Ochsenheimer in 1810. The species are cosmopolitan, except for the Neotropical realm.

Description
The male flies during the day. Its palpi are short, porrect (extending forward), and heavily fringed with hair. The antennae have long branches and long spines at the extremities. The legs are heavily hairy. The abdomen has a dorsal tuft on its second segment. The forewing has vein 9 arising from vein 10 and anastomosing with vein 8 to form an areole. The hindwing has veins 3 and 4 from angle of cell, vein 5 from just above angle, and vein 6 and 7 stalked.

In the female, the palpi and legs are less hairy. The antennae are serrate. The wings are aborted, scale-like and covered with hair. The abdomen is covered with hair and immensely dilated when full of eggs.

Species
Orgyia albofasciata (Schintlmeister, 1994)
Orgyia amphideta (Turner, 1902)
Orgyia antiqua (Linnaeus, 1758) – rusty tussock moth, vapourer moth
Orgyia araea (Collenette, 1932)
Orgyia ariadne (Schintlmeister, 1994)
Orgyia australis Walker, 1855
Orgyia basinigra (Heylaerts, 1892)
Orgyia cana H. Edwards, 1881
Orgyia chionitis (Turner, 1902)
Orgyia definita Packard, [1865] – definite tussock moth
Orgyia detrita Guérin-Méneville, [1832] – fir tussock moth
Orgyia dewara Swinhoe, 1903
Orgyia falcata Schaus, 1896
Orgyia fulviceps (Walker, 1855)
Orgyia leptotypa (Turner, 1904)
Orgyia leucostigma (Smith, 1797) – white-marked tussock moth
Orgyia leuschneri Riotte, 1972
Orgyia magna Ferguson, 1978
Orgyia osseana Walker, 1862
Orgyia papuana Riotte, 1976
Orgyia pelodes (Lower, 1893)
Orgyia postica (Walker, 1855)
Orgyia pseudotsugata (McDunnough, 1921) – Douglas-fir tussock moth
Orgyia semiochrea (Herrich-Schäffer, [1855])
Orgyia thyellina Butler, 1881
Orgyia vetusta Boisduval, 1852 – western tussock moth
Orgyia viridescens (Walker, 1855)

References

Lymantriinae
Moth genera